The men's 20 kilometres walk event at the 1983 Summer Universiade was held in Edmonton, Canada on 8 July 1983.

Results

References

Athletics at the 1983 Summer Universiade
1983